Greetings from Tim Buckley is a 2012 American film directed by Daniel Algrant starring Penn Badgley and Imogen Poots. The film follows the journey Jeff Buckley took in grappling with the legacy of his late musician father, Tim, leading up to and culminating with his performance of his father's songs. The film premiered at the 2012 Toronto International Film Festival on September 9, 2012 to generally positive reviews. The film was released on May 3, 2013, in a limited release.

Plot
In 1991, a young Jeff Buckley rehearses for his public singing debut at a Brooklyn tribute show for his father, the late folk singer Tim Buckley. Struggling with the legacy of a man he barely knew, Jeff forms a friendship with an enigmatic young woman Allie, working at the show and begins to discover the powerful potential of his own musical voice. Greetings from Tim Buckley is filled with stirring musical performances and the memorable songs of a father and son who were each among the most beloved singer/songwriters of their respective generations.

Cast
Penn Badgley as Jeff Buckley
Ben Rosenfield as Tim Buckley 
Imogen Poots as Allie, a young woman who meets Jeff Buckley while working at a concert.
Frank Wood as Gary Lucas 
Norbert Leo Butz as Hal Willner
Frank Bello as Richard Hell
Jennifer Turner as Herself

Production

Principal photography took place in August and September 2011 in New York City. Interior scenes were shot at St. Ann's Church in Brooklyn where Buckley's actual gig occurred back in 1991. Production was managed by Smuggler Films and A-Z productions. Screenwriters are Emma Sheanshang, David Brendel and Daniel Algrant. The executive producers include Brian Carmody and Jill Footlick (Boys Don't Cry, The Private Lives of Pippa Lee) and Ben Limberg. Producers are Fred Zollo, Patrick Milling-Smith, John Hart, and Amy Nauiokas. Avy Kauffman is the casting director.

Music used in the film comes from the Tim Buckley estate, except Leonard Cohen's "Hallelujah," which Jeff Buckley covered on his only studio album, the 1994 Grace.  Jeff's character and Gary Lucas also jam on the instrumental of "Grace" as a song idea that Gary had. Singer-songwriter Jann Klose sings and plays guitar on the Tim Buckley songs, "Song For Janie," "Pleasant Street," and "Once I Was."

Badgley was cast after he sent a tape of him singing. The audition tape that he sent included an interpretation of Led Zeppelin III, which also appears in the film. For the role, Badgley lost some weight: "I remember in my head thinking, 'I'm never going to be able to get as thin as him, so I'm just going to stop working out. I'm just going to stop getting in the sun. I'm just going to try to get as thin and pale as possible'." He also took guitar and vocal lessons. The vocal coach taught him how to warm up and warm down his voice and the guitar teacher taught him scales and progressions. Serving as a consultant, songwriter and former collaborator of Jeff Buckley,  Gary Lucas played and rehearsed with Badgley. Badgley performed all his singing scenes live.

Pictures of the set surfaced on August 22, 2011. while the first official images were released on August 14, 2012, with additional ones on August 24, 2012.

Algrant explained: "The concert is true – the rest is fictionalized and conjecture. I really tried to be as emotionally honest as I could be, as opposed to having to worry about truth."

Release
Celluloid Dreams obtained the international rights in January 2012. Focus Film and Tribeca acquired the U.S. rights in December 2012.

Greetings from Tim Buckley had its world premiere at the 2012 Toronto International Film Festival on September 9, 2012. The film was also screened at the Tribeca Film Festival on April 23, 2013 and was released in a limited release on May 3, 2013.

Reception
Upon its premiere at the 2012 Toronto International Film Festival, Deborah Young of The Hollywood Reporter said it was a "sensitive, well-cast film about father-son musicians Tim and Jeff Buckley gets the emotions and music just right". Young also praised lead actor Badgley for his "vibrant break-out performance" noting his "seductive energy" and Poots pointing out her "strong screen presence". Rolling Stone was also positive of Badgley's portrayal writing he "does an impressive turn as Jeff." The Globe and Mail placed Greetings from Tim Buckley among their top six favorite movies of the festival. Variety Dennis Harvey was critical of the narration deeming it "scant". He described Jeff as "a fine illustration of how good, even great art can be made by exasperating personalities that only a groupie (or biographer) could love" and concluded: "The result is at once skillfully observed and a bit so-what."

References

External links
 
 
 
 

2012 films
2010s biographical films
American biographical films
Biographical films about musicians
Biographical films about singers
Films directed by Daniel Algrant
Films set in 1991
Films shot in New York City
Cultural depictions of folk musicians
Cultural depictions of rock musicians
2010s English-language films
2010s American films